Atheresthes is a genus of righteye flounders native to the north Pacific Ocean where both species are important commercially.

Species
There are currently two recognized species in this genus:
 Atheresthes evermanni Jordan & Starks, 1904 (Kamchatka flounder)
 Atheresthes stomias (Jordan & Gilbert, 1880) (Arrowtooth flounder)

References 

 
Pleuronectidae
Marine fish genera
Taxa named by David Starr Jordan
Taxa named by Charles Henry Gilbert